"What It Is to Burn" is the debut single and title track off the album What It Is to Burn by the U.S. post-hardcore band Finch. It was released as a single in 2003 and was featured in the pilot episode of One Tree Hill. A demo version of the song was released on the Drive-Thru Records compilation CD Welcome to the Family in 2001.

Background 
In an interview with AOL, lead singer Nate Barcalow said he wrote this song from the viewpoint of a man in hell sending a letter to his loved one.

"What It Is to Burn" was first released in 2001 as a demo for a compilation by Drive-Thru Records entitled Welcome to the Family. This version is described as being longer and orchestral, as well as more popular within Finch's fanbase. The song was re-recorded and added as the title track for Finch's debut album in 2002. The shorter album version was released as a single in 2003, peaking at No. 15 on Billboard's Alternative Songs chart; to this date, it is Finch's only charting song in the United States.

Loudwire listed "What It Is to Burn" at No. 47 in their list of the Top 21st Century Hard Rock Songs.

Chart history

References

External links
 AOL interview 

2003 singles
2000s ballads
Songs written by Nate Barcalow
Finch (American band) songs
Rock ballads
2001 songs